George Barbour may refer to:
 George Pitty Barbour (1867–1951), Australian educator, Sydney Grammar School 1888–1910, Toowoomba Grammar School headmaster 1910–1935
 George Hilton Barbour (1878–1962), Canadian politician
 George Freeland Barbour (1882–1946), Scottish Liberal politician
 George Brown Barbour, (1890–1977), British geologist, discoverer of the Xiaochangliang site
 George H. Barbour (1917–1992), American politician from New Jersey
 George Harrison Barbour (1843–1934), American businessman, industrialist, financier, and manufacturer of stoves.
 George Barbour (Massachusetts), member of the colonial Massachusetts General Court